Thomas John Jelesky (born October 4, 1960) is a former American football offensive tackle who played two seasons, for the Philadelphia Eagles. He played in 1985 and in 1986. He played every game in 1985. In 2010, he was inducted into the Merrillville High School Athletics Hall of Fame.

References

1960 births
Living people 
Purdue Boilermakers football players
Philadelphia Eagles players
American football offensive tackles
Players of American football from Indiana
People from Merrillville, Indiana